All About Tonight may refer to:

 All About Tonight (EP), a 2010 extended play by Blake Shelton
 "All About Tonight" (Blake Shelton song), its title track
 "All About Tonight" (Pixie Lott song), 2011